Nutrition and Metabolic Insights is an open access and peer-reviewed scientific journal. It was established in 2008 and is published by Sage. It is indexed by ESCI, DOAJ, EBSCO, ProQuest, and PubMed Central (PMC).

References 

Open access journals
English-language journals
Nutrition and dietetics journals